Count Sámuel Teleki de Szék (1 November 1845 – 10 March 1916) was a Hungarian explorer who led the first expedition to Northern Kenya. He was the first European to see Lake Turkana

Early life
Teleki was born in 1845 in Sáromberke, a village in Transylvania, then in the Kingdom of Hungary and today in Romania.  He was a member of a prominent Hungarian family active in both politics and culture. His great-grandfather Sámuel Teleki (1739–1822), a chancellor of Transylvania, had founded the Teleki library in Marosvásárhely (today Târgu Mureș, Romania), one of the first Hungarian public libraries, which opened in 1802 and holds today more than 200,000 volumes.

For some 40 years, Count Sámuel Teleki von Szék, "a jovial Hungarian aristocrat of immense wealth," managed his property and assets and started a political career by becoming a member of the Hungarian Upper House of Parliament in 1881. A keen hunter, he was fascinated by the early African explorers. In 1886, he accepted a suggestion by his friend and benefactor, Crown Prince Rudolf of Austria, son of the Austro-Hungarian Emperor-King Franz Joseph I, to turn the East African safari he was planning into a journey of exploration of the territories north of Lake Baringo. He was to explore the lands beyond where Scottish explorer Joseph Thomson had set foot, in order to find the desert lake previous travellers had heard rumours about, based on local legends about a sea that lay beyond the desert, surrounded by tribes of giants and islands inhabited by monsters and ghosts.

His first expedition
Count Teleki and his companion, Lieutenant Ludwig von Höhnel, an Austrian naval officer, left Pangani (Tanzania) in February 1887 with around 400 porters, following the Ruvu River. They were the first to survey a great part of the East African Rift. He later headed on northwards, following the interior river system, to see on 5 March 1888 the last of the African Great Lakes, referred to as the Jade Sea by Count Teleki, who named the lake after his friend, Prince Rudolf. The lake was renamed Turkana in 1975 after the people that live to the west of its shores. Teleki's and von Höhnel's journey in southern Ethiopia also unveiled a smaller lake, Stefanie (named after Princess Stéphanie of Belgium, the prince's wife), now called Lake Chew Bahir. Though it is commonly stated that he discovered the body of water now referred to as Lake Turkana, the African people living around the lake certainly were aware of it. Even if the meaning of the word "discovery" is taken so as to put that aside, the existence of the lake was known in Europe decades prior to Teleki's expedition. As far back as 1849, Dr. Ludwig Krapf wrote about the Samburu people and his intentions of visiting their lands. A far more direct reference to the lake is found in an 1869 article in the Journal of the Royal Geographical Society. Here, the author, who himself relied on descriptions from African long distance traders, described a large water body. The article included a detailed map and here, the position, general shape and orientation are a perfect match for Lake Turkana.

His collection
Teleki and Höhnel made many observations on the climate, flora and fauna of the territories visited. One of the giant Lobelia plants found in the Afro-alpine belt of Mount Kenya is named Lobelia telekii, after Count Samuel Teleki. They also collected more than 400 ethnographical objects, most of them from Maasai and Kikuyu people and brought home a valuable collection of plants and animals.

Teleki's volcano
During the return to the East African coast, which they reached at Mombasa in October 1888, along the dry riverbed of the Turkwel, Teleki discovered an active volcano (Teleki’s Volcano) in South Kenya. On their way back, they stopped at Aden whence Teleki apparently intended to explore at a later date the Ethiopian highlands and the great lakes region from the north. In 1895 Teleki was back in Kenya in another unsuccessful effort to climb the Kilimanjaro.

East African diaries 
Teleki wrote "East African diaries", in Hungarian, 1886-95 with English translations. Von Höhnel wrote a report of the expedition entitled The discovery of Lakes Rudolf and Stefanie.

After the expedition, Teleki returned to his aristocratic life in Hungary, dying in Budapest after a long illness.

References

1845 births
1916 deaths
People from Mureș County
Hungarian explorers
Hungarian nobility
Samuel
Explorers of Africa